Riadh Tarsim (born 22 October 1973) is a French Para-cyclist who represented France at the 2020 Summer Paralympics.

Career
Tarsim represented France at 2021 UCI Para-cycling Road World Championships where he won gold in the road race H3 event.

Tarsim represented France at the 2020 Summer Paralympics in the mixed team relay H1–5 event and won a silver medal.

References

External links
 

Living people
1973 births
People from Zarzis
French male cyclists
Paralympic cyclists of France
Cyclists at the 2020 Summer Paralympics
Medalists at the 2020 Summer Paralympics
Paralympic medalists in cycling
Paralympic silver medalists for France
Naturalized citizens of France
French sportspeople of Tunisian descent
20th-century French people
21st-century French people